Philip & Son may refer to:

 Philip and Son, shipbuilders in Dartmouth, Devon, England
 George Philip and Son, cartographer and map publisher